Nashville Soccer Club is a Major League Soccer club based in Nashville, Tennessee. The team began play in the league in 2020 as a continuation of the USL club of the same name and plays its home matches at Geodis Park. It is principally owned by John Ingram, owner of Ingram Industries, along with investors and partial owners the Turner family of Dollar General Stores.

History

Soccer in Nashville 
Prior to the arrival of Nashville's MLS team, the city had various soccer teams which played in the lower divisions of American soccer. The most notable teams were the Nashville Metros who played from 1989 until 2012 and Nashville FC, who played in the National Premier Soccer League (NPSL) from 2013 to 2016. The city also hosts two NCAA Division I men's soccer teams, the Belmont Bruins and Lipscomb Bisons. The Vanderbilt Commodores also played Division I men's soccer until the team's demise after the 2005 season. Prior to these teams, the Nashville Diamonds participated in the then-second division American Soccer League for one season in 1982.

The NPSL team, Nashville FC, was founded by a supporters group that intended to form a team as a fan-owned group. Chris Jones, Nashville FC's president, cited existing fan-owned clubs as inspiration for NFC's foundation, in particular the English club F.C. United of Manchester. In February 2014, the two groups merged to form a single club for the 2014 NPSL season. The club had two teams participating in the Middle Tennessee Soccer Alliance, Nashville's largest competitive adult league, and had partnered with the Tennessee State Soccer Association (TSSA), an organization with over 20,000 registered players in the Middle Tennessee area alone. The team played its matches at Vanderbilt Stadium. The NPSL club had ambitions of climbing the American soccer pyramid, with the reported target an entry into the then third-tier United Soccer League (USL; now known as the USL Championship) by 2017, and then ascension into the Division II North American Soccer League by 2020. However, in 2016, the USL awarded a franchise to a separate ownership group in Nashville. Nashville FC subsequently sold its team name, logo, and color scheme to the new USL franchise, which became known as Nashville SC, in exchange for a 1 percent equity stake in the USL team and a voting seat on its board.

Expansion bid 
In August 2016, a group of Nashville business leaders from several of the city's largest corporations formed the Nashville MLS Organizing Committee and began efforts to secure funding for an MLS stadium. The group, led by Bill Hagerty, sought an MLS team immediately rather than working up the soccer pyramid. The group fully supported the recently awarded USL expansion team, Nashville SC, which began play in 2018. Both groups supported each other in their common vision to grow the sport in Tennessee. In October 2017, the group unveiled their plans for $275 million stadium and redevelopment project, which was approved by the city in November.

The formal bid to add an MLS franchise to Nashville began in January 2017. On March 4, 2017, businessman John Ingram, under the entity Nashville Holdings LLC, bought a majority stake in DMD Soccer, the ownership group of Nashville SC. Ingram also headed up the bid to bring an MLS franchise to Nashville, and the partnership between Ingram and Nashville SC was an effort to present a united front to MLS after Nashville was named one of ten finalist cities for four MLS franchises. In August 2017, Mark Wilf, Zygi Wilf and Leonard Wilf joined as investors; the Wilfs, owners of the National Football League's Minnesota Vikings, had previously backed an aborted MLS expansion bid in Minneapolis.

MLS officially awarded an expansion team to Nashville on December 20, 2017, and announced that they would join the league in 2020. On May 21, 2018, Ian Ayre was announced as the CEO of the franchise. On October 30, 2018, Mike Jacobs was announced as the general manager of the franchise.

On February 20, 2019, the franchise operators announced that the MLS side would assume the Nashville Soccer Club name then in use by the city's USL Championship side.

Inaugural season 
Nashville SC's inaugural MLS match was February 29, 2020, with the club hosting Atlanta United FC at Nissan Stadium. The game was played in front of 59,069, becoming the highest attended soccer event in Tennessee. Walker Zimmerman scored the team's first goal in the 2–1 loss. The inaugural season came to a halt on March 12, 2020, after only two games when the MLS suspended the season for thirty days due to the COVID-19 pandemic, then extended to until May 10, 2020. On June 10, MLS announced MLS is Back Tournament, but were unable to participate in the tournament due to multiple COVID cases on the team. Their next game was an August 12 win against FC Dallas, the first in franchise history. Nashville SC finished the 2020 regular season 8–8–7 with 32 points. They entered the MLS Cup playoffs in the play-in round beating Inter Miami 3–0 before knocking off Toronto FC 1–0 in the first round, Nashville in the conference semi-finals 2–0.

Club crest and colors
Nashville SC's primary colors are electric gold and acoustic blue, referencing the colors of Nashville’s flag. The club's crest is a gold octagon with a monogram "N" and several vertical bars in blue. The vertical bars were chosen to represent sound waves and vibrations, referencing the city's musical history.

Sponsorship

Stadium 

The team plays at Geodis Park, a 30,000-seat soccer-specific stadium at the Nashville Fairgrounds. The $275 million stadium was mostly funded by revenue bonds from the Nashville government, per an agreement with the Nashville Metro Council that was approved in November 2017. The council approved the stadium on September 4, 2018, with the votes 31-yes and 8-no, with a crowd in the audience in the room. A proposal to submit the plan to a referendum based on Metro government's "partial funding" was rejected by the council, with the votes 25-yes (to reject the referendum) and 12-no (to permit).

In January 2019, John Rose, a U.S. representative from Cookeville led the nonprofit that operates the Tennessee State Fair to sue the team to halt construction, citing that the stadium would not leave adequate space required for the functions of the fair. However, in February of the same year, Rose and the nonprofit dismissed the lawsuit citing that city officials would not meet with the nonprofit while this suit was pending. Demolition on the Fairgrounds site began in March 2020.

The agreement of the stadium and its funding details was amended on February 13, 2020, with the help of Nashville Mayor John Cooper to make the stadium 100 percent privately funded with the team will also funding $19 million of infrastructure improvements in the immediate area.

Nashville, for their first two seasons, had played in Nissan Stadium; owned by the NFL's Tennessee Titans. Due to the COVID-19 pandemic, there were limited seating capacity in their tenure while using the stadium.

Players and staff

Current roster

Out on loan

Staff

Records

Seasons

This is a list of MLS seasons completed by Nashville. For the full season-by-season history, see List of Nashville SC seasons.

Honors

MLS Cup Playoff Appearances: 2020, 2021, 2022

1. Avg. attendance include statistics from league matches only.
2. Top goalscorer(s) includes all goals scored in League, Playoffs, U.S. Open Cup, MLS is Back Tournament, CONCACAF Champions League, FIFA Club World Cup, and other competitive continental matches.

References

External links
 

 
2017 establishments in Tennessee
Association football clubs established in 2017
Soccer clubs in Tennessee
Major League Soccer teams
Sports in Nashville, Tennessee
Ingram family
Turner family
Wilf family